Erik Fleming is an American cinema and TV director and producer. He is a graduate of USC School of Cinematic Arts. He is mostly known for creating the 1994 experimental short film, The Silver Surfer, which portrayed the famous character in CGI.

Partial filmography
My Brother the Pig (1999)
Cyber Bandits (1995)
The Silver Surfer (1992)

External links

References

Year of birth missing (living people)
Living people
American film directors
USC School of Cinematic Arts alumni